Steel Mountain is the highest point in Boise National Forest and the second highest point in the Boise Mountains at an elevation of .

References 

Mountains of Idaho
Mountains of Elmore County, Idaho
Boise National Forest